Osteochilus borneensis is a species of cyprinid fish endemic to Borneo and Sumatra.

References

Taxa named by Pieter Bleeker
Fish described in 1856
Osteochilus